The Samsung Galaxy 5, (also called Samsung GT-I5500, Samsung GT-I5503, Samsung GT-I5510M, Samsung Galaxy Europa, Samsung Galaxy 550, Samsung Corby Smartphone and Samsung Corby Android in some countries), is a smartphone. It uses the open source Android operating system (OS). It was announced on June 15, 2010.

Specifications
The phone measures  x  x . It ships with Android 2.1 Eclair (or 2.2 Froyo) operating system and supports the HSDPA ("3.5G") mobile telephony protocol at 7.2 Mbit/s. The user interface features a capacitive touchscreen but does not support multi-touch as found on high end smartphones. The  screen supports QVGA (240 x 320 pixels) resolution with a 16M color depth. The communication features include Bluetooth, 3G, Wi-Fi and A-GPS.

Android
When originally released, the phone came with Android 2.1 Eclair as the preinstalled OS. , most phones are shipping with Android 2.2 Froyo. Some carriers allow an update from Android 2.1 to 2.2 via the Samsung Kies software package, that is bundled with the phone. Froyo brought many new features to the phone, including voice dialling.

Unofficially, the phone can run Android 2.3 Gingerbread, Android 4.0.4 Ice Cream Sandwich, Android 4.3 Jelly Bean or Android 4.4.4 KitKat via three different ports of CyanogenMod made by the same group. At this time, these ports have, together, over 110,000 installations at Samsung i5500 devices.

See also
Samsung Galaxy Mini
Samsung Galaxy S (2010 smartphone)
Samsung Galaxy 3
Samsung Galaxy Tab
Galaxy Nexus

References

External links

Samsung smartphones
Android (operating system) devices
Galaxy 5
Mobile phones introduced in 2010
Mobile phones with user-replaceable battery